The California Community College Athletic Association (CCCAA) is a sports association of community colleges in the U.S. state of California.  It oversees 108 athletic programs throughout the state.  The organization was formed in 1929 as the California Junior College Federation to unify programs in Northern and Southern California.

Over 26,000 student athletes participate annually in intercollegiate athletics at California’s community colleges and more than 100 regional and state final events produce champions in 24 men’s and women’s sports each year.  The majority of student athletes participating at a California community college transfer to a four-year college or university to continue their academic and athletic endeavors.

There are nine all-sport conferences, two football-only conferences, and three wrestling-only alliances.

Sports

The CCCAA sponsors championships in the following sports:

Records
List of CCCAA Championship records in track and field

Conferences

Bay Valley Conference
 College of Alameda
 College of Marin
 Contra Costa College
 Laney College
 Los Medanos College
 Mendocino College
 Merritt College
 Napa Valley College
 Solano College
 Yuba College

Big 8 Conference

 American River College
 Cosumnes River College
 Diablo Valley College
 Folsom Lake College
 Modesto Junior College
 Sacramento City College
 San Joaquin Delta College
 Santa Rosa Junior College
 Sierra College

Central Valley Conference
 Clovis Community College
 College of the Sequoias
 Columbia College
 Fresno City College
 Madera Community College
 Merced College
 Porterville College
 Reedley College
 Taft College
 West Hills College Coalinga
 West Hills College Lemoore

Coast Conference

North
 Cañada College
 Chabot College
 City College of San Francisco
 College of San Mateo
 Foothill College
 Las Positas College
 Ohlone College
 Skyline College

South
 Cabrillo College
 De Anza College
 Evergreen Valley College
 Gavilan College
 Hartnell College
 Mission College
 Monterey Peninsula College
 San Jose City College
 West Valley College

Golden Valley Conference
 Butte College
 Feather River College
 Lake Tahoe Community College
 Lassen College
 College of the Redwoods
 Shasta College
 College of the Siskiyous

Inland Empire Athletic Conference
 Barstow College
 Cerro Coso Community College
 Chaffey College
 College of the Desert
 Copper Mountain College
 Crafton Hills College
 Mt. San Jacinto College
 Norco College
 Palo Verde College
 San Bernardino Valley College
 Victor Valley College

Orange Empire Conference
 Cypress College
 Fullerton College
 Golden West College
 Irvine Valley College
 Orange Coast College
 Riverside City College
 Saddleback College
 Santa Ana College
 Santiago Canyon College

Pacific Coast Athletic Conference
 Cuyamaca College
 Grossmont College
 Imperial Valley College
 MiraCosta College
 Palomar College
 San Diego City College
 San Diego Mesa College
 San Diego Miramar College
 Southwestern College

South Coast Conference
 Cerritos College
 Compton College
 East Los Angeles College
 El Camino College
 Long Beach City College
 Los Angeles Harbor College
 Los Angeles Southwest College
 Los Angeles Trade-Technical College
 Mt. San Antonio College
 Pasadena City College
 Rio Hondo College

Western State Conference

North
 Allan Hancock College
 Antelope Valley College
 Cuesta College
 Los Angeles Pierce College
 Moorpark College
 Oxnard College
 Santa Barbara City College
 Ventura College

South
 Bakersfield College
 Citrus College
 College of the Canyons
 Glendale Community College
 Los Angeles Mission College
 Los Angeles Valley College
 Santa Monica College
 West Los Angeles College

See also
 National Association of Intercollegiate Athletics (NAIA)
 National Collegiate Athletic Association (NCAA)
 National Christian College Athletic Association (NCCAA)
 National Junior College Athletic Association (NJCAA)
 United States Collegiate Athletic Association (USCAA)

References

External links
 

 
College sports governing bodies in the United States